Ross Stewart may refer to:

 Ross Stewart (footballer, born 1995) (Ross M. Stewart), Scottish football goalkeeper
 Ross Stewart (footballer, born 1996) (Ross C. Stewart), Scottish football forward for Sunderland A.F.C.